

History
The ACA Cyclone was designed by James E. Biersach of Alerting Communicators of America and presented at a Civil Defense convention in November 1968. It was originally rated at 120dB at 100 feet, but was eventually redesigned to the point of reaching 125dB at 100 feet. It utilizes a 40 HP motor (120) or 50 HP motor (125) due to the drag-heavy rotor design. The rotor consists of a "double intake" design, which is believed to have been inspired by Federal's 500 SH-TT siren rotor.

The first version, the 1968 Cyclone 120, had both rows of ports angled downwards. Like some of the other 1968 ACA siren designs, it was changed shortly after to improve performance. These improvements included a new, simple intake, and most notably the top row of ports being straightened out, as to direct the low tone outwards for maximum range while projecting the high tone downwards to the immediate area. At some point afterwards we also saw the use of the long, curved intake as seen on their 3 signal sirens. This allowed for an optional coding damper to be added, which produced a pulsating "local code" tone.

In 1979, ACA was experimenting with the design of the Cyclone 120 to try and get the best performance possible. This included a slightly re-designed top cover, and a ring placed around the bottom of the stator to direct the sound outwards more smoothly. In 1980, this design was scrapped, and ACA unveiled the Cyclone 125. The Cyclone 125 came fitted with a new intake, a sound dispersion cone in the intake, and most notably a parallel stator, projecting both the high tone and low tone outwards. This was further assisted by a lip or "ring" added to the top cover of the siren. At this time, ACA unveiled the Penetrator-50, a 135dB rotating siren which replaced the Hurricane 130. The P-50 reused the rotor and stator of the Cyclone 120, and was produced alongside the Cyclone 125 until the early 2000s when both sirens were discontinued in favor of more modern sirens.

Technical information
The ACA Cyclone was an electro-mechanical, omni-directional outdoor warning siren produced from 1968 to 2007 by Alerting Communicators of America (ACA). 

Early versions of the Cyclone were rated at 120dB @ 100ft, and later models were rated at 125dB.

Sirens
1968 introductions
Emergency population warning systems